Keyhole Falls is the unofficial name for the largest waterfall along the Lillooet River in British Columbia, Canada.

It is called Keyhole Falls because it resembles a giant old-fashioned keyhole.

Formation
Keyhole Falls was formed when the Lillooet River was dammed with breccia from a Plinian eruption at the Mount Meager massif about 2350 years ago. The thick breccia soon eroded from water activity, forming Keyhole Falls. There was a massive flood when the water first broke through the breccia. The flood was big enough that small house-sized blocks of breccia were carried away during the flood.

Access
There are no developed trails leading to any clear view of the falls. Due to how undercut the cliff is, one cannot see the falls by looking down into the canyon from the cliff's edge.

See also
List of waterfalls of British Columbia

References

Waterfalls of British Columbia
Pemberton Valley